A labial–coronal consonant is a consonant produced with two simultaneous articulators: With the lips ('labial'; a , , or  sound), and with the tongue (at the gums, an 'alveolar' , , or  sound, or further back, a 'post-alveolar' ,  sound).

Several languages have been claimed to have such sounds, such as Margi and Bura in Nigeria. However, most researchers interpret them as having sequences of labial and coronal consonants, a rather common occurrence in Africa. The Yélî Dnye language of Rossel Island, Papua New Guinea, appears to be unique in having distinct labial–alveolar and labial–postalveolar places of articulation, as illustrated below. (The alveolars are fronted, and the post-alveolars only slightly retracted, so it may be best not to consider the latter to be retroflex as they are sometimes described.)

Labial–coronal allophones 

In some Ghanaian languages such as Dagbani, and Nzema, there are palatalized allophones of labial–velars. These are sometimes mistakenly referred to as labial–alveolars, though they actually have a post-alveolar or palatal articulation instead of a true alveolar one.

Something similar is found with the labialized alveolar stops in several Northwest and Northeast Caucasian languages such as Abkhaz and Lak. Although the double stop articulation may be more common, they are generally considered to be essentially labialized alveolars because the labial contact is light, and moreover the contact is between the inner surfaces of the lips, which are protruded as they are for [w]. This is quite different from the normal contact for [p] in these languages. The labial contact may also be realized as a trill. Compare the following minimal sets in Ubykh:

Some speakers of !Xóõ have a labial–dental allophone,  (or ), of the bilabial click  in some cases (Traill 1985: 103–104).

Discounting clicks otherwise as having a velar/lingual airstream mechanism rather than a double articulation, nearly all other doubly articulated consonants in the world are labial–velars. (See Margi language.)

References

Place of articulation